Weymouth Museum is a museum in Weymouth, Dorset, England. Its permanent home is in Brewers Quay on the south side of Hope Square near Weymouth Harbour. However, due to redevelopment of the building, it is currently operating from a pop-up shop at 40b St Thomas Street in Weymouth.

History
Weymouth Museum was founded in 1972 and originally occupied the former Melcombe Regis Boys' School at Westham Road. Following the school's closure in the 1960s, it was used to host a temporary local history exhibition in 1971, which had been set up by Jack West of Weymouth Library. The success of the exhibition led to the building becoming the home of the permanent Weymouth Museum in 1972. Later in 1987, plans were revealed for the area's redevelopment, which included transforming part of the harbour into Weymouth Marina. The museum had to vacate the former school, which was set to be demolished, in January 1989. After a period of uncertainty over the future, Weymouth Museum relocated to Brewers Quay, a former brewery which was being transformed into an indoor shopping complex by Devenish Brewery and Weymouth & Portland Borough Council. A 25 year agreement between Devenish and the Friends of Weymouth Museum group was signed and the museum's collection was moved to the new location.

Brewers Quay opened in June 1990 and Weymouth Museum initially operated alongside the Timewalk exhibition, which took visitors on a journey covering the town's history and maritime connections from the 14th century onwards. The museum later separated from the exhibition in 1999 so that it could be converted into a charitable trust, and re-opened in 2000. However, as Brewers Quay had been suffering operational losses since its opening, a succession of new owners of the building disrupted the museum's plans. Brewers Quay was sold to a local investment group, Brewers Quay Investment LLP, in 2010, and the building then closed for redevelopment. Space was set to be retained for the museum, however the new owners ultimately decided that their plans were not viable. Brewers Quay reopened primarily as an antiques emporium in 2013, which saw temporary space provided for the museum, which re-opened in December that year.

Weymouth Museum closed again in 2016, with the Brewers Quay emporium closing in 2017. In January 2016, Weymouth and Portland Borough Council gave approval of Weymouth Museum Trust's plans to relocate and expand the museum within Brewers Quay as part of the building's wider redevelopment project. The trust revealed its intentions to gain some of the estimated £300,000 project cost from the Heritage Lottery Fund, while the council pledged £94,000. In March 2018, the museum reopened using temporary exhibitions to display a small proportion of its collection within Brewers Quay. The £300,000 redevelopment project is expected to be completed for a 2020 opening.

See also
 Tudor House Museum

References

External links
 Weymouth Museum - official site

Jurassic Coast
Tourist attractions in Weymouth, Dorset
Museums in Weymouth, Dorset
History of Weymouth, Dorset
Local museums in Dorset
1972 establishments in England
Museums established in 1972